Pickl is a chain of American-style fast food burger joints founded in the UAE in 2019. As of February 2023, Pickl has 12 locations in the UAE plus one franchised international restaurant in Bahrain. It focuses on "fresh fast food" using premium ingredients that are free from hormones, preservatives, or antibiotics.

History

Early History 
The first Pickl opened in Dubai's Jumeirah Lakes Towers community in April 2019 at the One JLT building. Drawing on his experience from fine-dining restaurants, the menu was created by founder Steve Flawith, with a trifecta offering of cheeseburgers, chicken sandos, and plant-based burger options.

Pickl was immediately popular, with Esquire Middle East calling it "one of the city's top burger joints". It expanded quickly, with new stores opening in Motor City, Al Safa, and Madinat Badr.

Time Out Market 
In April 2021, the brand was selected as one of Dubai's best homegrown brands and inducted into Time Out Market, alongside brands including Reif Kushiyaki, Mattar, Masti, and BB Social Dining.

An/Other Pop-up 
PIckl opened a concept pop-up store in July 2021. Open for just one year, it was built around the concept of 100 Years of Burgers, with the menu changing every three months to introduce the next generation of historic burgers including ones based upon the Big Mac and In-N-Out's classic Double Double.

Domestic and International Expansion 
By the end of 2021, Pickl has expanded to Abu Dhabi, opening its first store at Soul Beach, Mamsha, and following it up with a second in early 2022 at World Trade Centre. Following the end of the An/Other pop-up, a full-scale Pickl restaurant was opened in City Walk, and by the end of 2022, the brand was in four Emirates with outlets opening in Sharjah and RAK in December. In early 2023, Pickl made it's first foray into the international market with the opening of a franchised outlet in Bahrain in partnership with Zayani Foods.

Pickl in the Metaverse 
Pickl became the first Middle East F&B brand to enter the Metaverse when it collaborated with CBI at Gitex in 2022. The two brands partnered to create a virtual Pickl restaurant which Gitex attendees could visit and place their orders in the digital world before receiving their food physically at the event.

Future Plans

Global Ambitions 
The brand has revealed ambitious plans to open 200 stores globally by 2027, including 50 in the GCC.

References 

Companies established in 2019
Restaurants in the United Arab Emirates
Restaurant franchises